Working Key to the Genera of North American Algae is an influential early technical reference book on identification of algae in North America.

It was written by Frank Shipley Collins, and published in 1918.

See also
Flora of North America

References

North America
Florae (publication)
Marine biota of North America
Botany in North America
1918 non-fiction books
North America